Moonstar88 is a Filipino rock band formed in Manila, Philippines in 1999.

History
Moonstar88 was formed in February 1999. They were signed to Sony BMG by 2006, and later to Ivory Records in 2012. Previously under Backbeat Management, they are now with Soupstar Management under Darwin Hernandez which also handles other bands including Sandwich, Callalily, 6cyclemind, Pedicab.

As of April 2008, they had released four albums, Popcorn, Press to Play and Todo Combo. Later, “This Year” and a collaboration on "Pag-Ibig Ko Sa Iyo", found on RoK On! Music inspired by Ragnarok Online were released in 2012 and 2009 respectively. They performed a rendition of the APO song "Panalangin." It was later added to the tribute album for the band Apo Hiking Society on the album, Kami nAPO Muna. The band has also recorded a cover of Yano's famous song, "Senti".

They released the album This Year under Ivory music. It contained eight songs, including a track featuring Parokya Ni Edgar's Chito Miranda and an acoustic version of "Migraine”.

This Year won the Best Design Packaging Category at the ADOBO Design Awards 2013 held on 26 April at the Ayala Museum, Makati.

2015–Present 
In early 2015, Bernaldo started playing for Parokya ni Edgar when their bassist Buwi Meneses announced a hiatus from the band due to relocating with his family in USA. Bernaldo was asked to leave from the group without a formal announcement from any member of the band that he was already dismissed. Bubby Zabala of Eraserheads took his place and is currently playing and recording for the band recently. Although it is still unclear, no formal announcement was made.

Band members
Current members
Maysh Baay - vocals/guitar (2004–present)
Buddy Zabala - bass (2016–present)
Bon Sundiang - drums/vocals (2005–present)
Herbert Hernandez - lead guitar (1999–present)

Touring members
James Roy Linao - guitars
Berns Cuevas - bass, lead guitar 
Vic Aquino - drums
Karmi Santiago - drums
Past members
Paolo Bernaldo - bass (1999–2015) 
Acel Bisa - vocals, guitar (1999–2004)
William Pineda - drums, percussion (1999–2004)
Teng Marcelo - guitars, vocals (1999–2001)(Currently on a hardcorepunk band xHis Divine Gracex)

Discography

Studio albums

EPs

Singles

Awards and nominations

References

External links

Filipino rock music groups
Musical groups established in 1999
Musical groups from Metro Manila
1999 establishments in the Philippines
Female-fronted musical groups